Clear-cell carcinoma, also known as clear-cell adenocarcinoma and mesonephroma,  is an epithelial-cell-derived carcinoma characterized by the presence of clear cells observed during histological, diagnostic assessment. This form of cancer is classified as a rare cancer with an incidence of 4.8% in white patients, 3.1% in black patients, and 11.1% in Asian patients.

Clear-cell carcinoma may arise in multiple tissue types including the kidney (clear-cell renal-cell carcinoma), ovary (ovarian clear-cell carcinoma), uterus (uterine clear-cell carcinoma) or gastrointestinal tract (colorectal clear-cell carcinoma). 

Treatment options for clear cell carcinoma vary by the tissue type affected. It may include a combination of  chemotherapy (paclitaxel and carboplatin or irinotecan plus cisplatin) and surgical resection in ovarian clear-cell carcinoma; debulking or resection  paired with chemotherapy (cisplatin) in ovarian clear-cell carcinoma; cytokine therapy (IL-2, interferon), kinase inhibitors (temsirolimus,  sunitinib, sorafenib, pazopanib) and anti-angiogenic therapies (bevacizumab).

References 

Carcinoma